Ogontz Hall is a historic combined residential and commercial building complex in the West Oak Lane neighborhood of Philadelphia, Pennsylvania. Built in 1929, it consists of six buildings, the primary one being the four-story Ogontz Hall; the others are three stories. The buildings share a commercial front. They have Spanish Colonial Revival architecture with a limestone and buff brick exterior and terra cotta tile roofing.

The Hall was added to the National Register of Historic Places in 1991.

References

Commercial buildings on the National Register of Historic Places in Philadelphia
Residential buildings on the National Register of Historic Places in Philadelphia
Colonial Revival architecture in Pennsylvania
Commercial buildings completed in 1929
West Oak Lane, Philadelphia